Jenaro Sanjinés Calderón (19 September 1843 – 1 December 1913) was a Bolivian lawyer, teacher, journalist, and politician who served as the 12th vice president of Bolivia from 1896 to 1899. He served as second vice president alongside first vice president Rafael Peña de Flores during the administration of Severo Fernández.

References 

1843 births
1913 deaths
Conservative Party (Bolivia) politicians
Vice presidents of Bolivia